The 1990–1991 season was the 112th season in Bolton Wanderers F.C.'s existence, and their third successive season in the Football League Third Division. It covers the period from 1 July 1990 to 30 June 1991.

Playing Squad

Results

Barclays League Division Three

Barclays League Division Three play-offs

F.A. Cup

Rumbelows Cup

Leyland DAF Cup

Top scorers

Bolton Wanderers F.C. seasons
Bolton Wanderers